Below are the squads for the 20th Arabian Gulf Cup in Yemen played in 2010. Caps and goals are correct prior to the tournament.

Group A

Yemen
Coach:  Srećko Juričić

Kuwait
Coach:  Goran Tufegdžić

Qatar
Coach:  Bruno Metsu

The squad was announced on 16 November 2010

Saudi Arabia
Coach:  José Peseiro

Group B

Oman
Coach: Hamad Al-Azani

Iraq
Coach:  Wolfgang Sidka

United Arab Emirates
Head coach:  Srecko Katanec

The squad was announced on 7 November 2010

Bahrain
Coach: Salman Sharida

References

squads